The 3rd Cork Brigade, also known as Third (West) Cork Brigade, was a unit of the Irish Republican Army that operated in the western areas of County Cork during the Irish War of Independence. The unit was commanded by Tom Barry for most of the conflict and was responsible for the Kilmichael Ambush and Crossbarry Ambush.

Activities
Under the command of Tom Barry, who later described many of the unit's activities in Guerrilla Days in Ireland (1949), the 3rd Cork Brigade was one of the most active during the Irish War of Independence. Its actions were focused on the West Cork area, and included the Kilmichael Ambush in November 1920, which resulted in the deaths of 18 members of the Auxiliary Division, and the Crossbarry Ambush of March 1921, during which the unit escaped encirclement by 1,200 British troops.

Other activities, planned by the unit, were aborted. For example, a planned attack on a Black and Tan barracks in Kilbrittain was called-off after two aborted attempts. Towards the end of 1920, members the unit planned an attack on the barracks, proposing to plant a mine against a door or wall and to storm the barracks immediately after it exploded. A "home-made" mine was made, consisting of 30 pounds of gelignite and gun cotton encased in a wooden box. On the night of 31 December 1920, and again in mid-January 1921, two attempts were made. On both occasions the
mines failed to explode, and the attacks were aborted.

Actions associated with the brigade

See also
 Timeline of the Irish War of Independence
North Longford Flying Column

References

External links
 Cork's War of Independence - List of Third Brigade incidents

Irish Republican Army (1919–1922)